Wzgórze Mickiewicza is one of the quarters of the city of Gdańsk, Poland. It was established on 5th October 1954 in the area of the village of Nowe Ujeścisko which was renamed to after the  Polish poet Adam Mickiewicz. It is literally translated into English as "The Hillock of Mickiewicz".
 
Wzgórze Mickiewicza borders with two other districts of Gdańsk: Siedlce and Chełm i Gdańsk Południe. It is situated close to the Gdańsk cemetery Cmentarz Łostowicki.

Most streets are named after the characters of Mickiewicz's book Pan Tadeusz (e.g. Ulica Jacka Soplicy, Ulica Telimeny). Some of them bear the names of the characters of other works (e.g. Ulica Świtezianki, Ulica Rusałki) by Mickiewicz or of people connected with the poets life (e.g. Ulica Maryli, Ulica Filaretów).

References

Districts of Gdańsk
Gdańsk